Minnesota Woman, also known as Pelican Rapids-Minnesota Woman (c. 5947–5931 BC), is the skeletal remains of a woman thought to be 8,000 years old. The bones were found near Pelican Rapids, Minnesota on June 16, 1931, during construction on U.S. Route 59. The bones were brought to Albert Jenks at the University of Minnesota, who identified them as the bones of a woman who was 15 or 16 years old, but who had never borne children. The woman had two artifacts—a dagger made from an elk's horn and a conch shell pendant. The conch shell came from a whelk species known as Sinistrofulgur perversum, which had previously only been known to exist in Florida.

Discovery
The road crew dug up the site without an investigation by archaeologists, so some of the exact details of the woman's death were hard to determine. The site indicated that the woman had not been ritually buried, and there was a thin layer of broken clam or mussel shells over the body. This led to the hypothesis that the woman had drowned, either by breaking through the ice or by falling off a boat, and that her body had been covered in mud at the bottom of a glacial lake.

Before 1926, most scientists theorized that human beings had only appeared in America within the last couple of thousand years. The discovery of Minnesota Woman provided evidence that humans had been in America for many thousand years before that. Scientists now recognize the girl as someone whose ancestors were Paleo-Indian. Radiocarbon dating places the age of the bones approximately 8,000 years ago, approximately 7890 ±70 BP (i.e. between 6009 and 5869 BC); near the beginning of the Archaic period in Minnesota.

These skeletal remains have been reburied in South Dakota on October 2, 1999, by Sioux tribes and are not available for further study.

See also
List of human evolution fossils
List of unsolved deaths

Notes

References
 
 
 
 

Archaeological sites in Minnesota
Human remains (archaeological)
Native American history of Minnesota
Oldest human remains in the Americas
Otter Tail County, Minnesota
Paleo-Indian period
Pre-statehood history of Minnesota
Women in Minnesota
6th-millennium BC people